Abortion in California is legal up to the point of fetal viability. An abortion ban was in place by 1900, and by 1950, it was a criminal offense for a woman to have an abortion. In 1962, the American Law Institute published their model penal code as it applied to abortions, with three circumstances where they believed a physician could justifiably perform an abortion, and California adopted a version of this code. In 2002, California passed a law guaranteeing women the right to have an abortion "prior to viability of the fetus, or when the abortion is necessary to protect the life or health of the woman." In 2022, California voters overwhelmingly approved Proposition 1, which amended the Constitution of California to explicitly protect the right to abortion and contraception by a margin of 33.76%.

In response to crisis pregnancy centers (CPCs) providing misleading and inaccurate information to pregnant women, the California Legislature passed the Reproductive FACT (Freedom, Accountability, Comprehensive Care, and Transparency) Act (AB-755), which required CPCs to post visible notices that other options for pregnancy, including abortion, are available from state-sponsored clinics. It also mandated that unlicensed centers post notice of their unlicensed status. The centers, typically run by Christian non-profit groups, challenged the act on the basis that it violated their right free speech. The law was subsequently struck down as unconstitutional in a controversial 5-4 decision along ideological lines by the U.S. Supreme Court. California allows qualified non-physician health professionals, such as physician assistants, nurse practitioners, and certified nurse midwives, to do first-trimester aspiration abortions, and to prescribe drugs for medical abortions. There have been a number of abortion-related cases before the California Supreme Court, California Courts of Appeal, and the U.S. District Court for the Southern District of California since 1969.

There have been deaths in California as a result of illegal abortions, including 35 in 1966 and 1967, 22 in 1968 and 1969, and one between 1972 and 1974. California uses its own funds to cover all "medically necessary" abortions sought by low-income women under Medicaid. 88,466 were state-funded in 2010.

California has an active abortion rights activist community. Society for Human Abortion was founded in 1963 in San Francisco. People in California participated in #StopTheBans protested in May 2019, including at protests in San Francisco and Los Angeles. There is also an active anti-abortion rights community. Singer Pat Boone announced he recorded a song titled "Sixteen Thousand Faces" about the Los Angeles fetus disposal scandal in May 1985. The first Walk for Life was held on January 22, 2005. A number of acts of anti-abortion rights violence have also taken place in the state, including an attempted bombing in July 1987, fires at clinics in the late 1980s and early 1990s, and an act of violence in San Francisco in February 1995 and another in Modesto in March 2003.

History 
On May 31, 2019, Democratic Governor Gavin Newsom issued a proclamation explaining California's abortion laws and encouraged women from states seeking to restrict a woman's ability to get an abortion to come to California for an abortion if she needs one. The statement read in part, "California will continue to uphold women's equality and liberty by protecting their reproductive freedom, educating Californians about their rights to reproductive freedom, welcoming women to California to fully exercise their reproductive rights, and acting as a model for other states that want to ensure full reproductive freedom for women."

Legislative history 
In the 19th century, bans by state legislatures on abortion were about protecting the life of the mother given the number of deaths caused by abortions; state governments saw themselves as looking out for the lives of their citizens. By 1950, the state legislature would pass a law that stating that a woman who had an abortion or actively sought to have an abortion regardless of whether she went through with it were guilty of a criminal offense.

In 1962, the American Law Institute published their model penal code as it applied to abortions with three circumstances where they believed a physician could justifiably perform an abortion, "If ... there is substantial risk that the continuance of the pregnancy would gravely impair the physical or mental health of the mother or that the child would be born with grave physical or mental defect, or that the pregnancy resulted from rape, incest, or other felonious intercourse." In 1967, the California State Legislature adopted a form of this into law, but did not allow an exception for birth defects. Alaska, Hawaii, California, and New York were the only four states that made abortion legal between 1967 and 1970 that did not require a reason to request an abortion. California amended its abortion law in 1967 to address the disconnect between legal and medical justifications for therapeutic exceptions. This change made them one of the most progressive states in the country when it came to abortion rights. The bill was signed into law by Governor Ronald Reagan, after the legislature removed as a reason for legal abortion that a child had severe physical deformities. State law in 1971 required that any woman getting a legal abortion in the state needed to be a resident for some specific period between 30 and 90 days.

In 2002, the California State Legislature passed a law that said: "The state may not deny or interfere with a woman's right to choose or obtain an abortion prior to viability of the fetus, or when the abortion is necessary to protect the life or health of the woman." The state was one of ten states in 2007 to have a customary informed consent provision for abortions. Based on a report prepared by NARAL Pro-Choice America, which alleged that Crisis Pregnancy Centers (CPCs) were providing misleading and inaccurate information, the California Legislature passed the Reproductive FACT (Freedom, Accountability, Comprehensive Care, and Transparency) Act (AB-755) in October 2015. It required any licensed healthcare facility that provided care services related to pregnancies to post a notice that stated "California has public programs that provide immediate free or low-cost access to comprehensive family planning services (including all FDA-approved methods of contraception), prenatal care, and abortion for eligible women." The law set provisions where this notice was to be posted and established civil fines if facilities did not comply. The act required unlicensed facilities which offered certain pregnancy-related services to post a notice stating: "This facility is not licensed as a medical facility by the State of California and has no licensed medical provider who provides or directly supervises the provision of all of the services, whose primary purpose is providing pregnancy-related services." The Supreme Court of the United States found that the law violated the First Amendment in 2018 in National Institute of Family and Life Advocates v. Becerra.

As of 2017, California, Oregon, Montana, Vermont, and New Hampshire allow qualified non-physician health professionals, such as physicians' assistants, nurse practitioners, and certified nurse midwives, to do first-trimester aspiration abortions and to prescribe drugs for medical abortions. In August 2018, the state had a law to protect the right to have an abortion. As of May 14, 2019, the state prohibits abortions after the fetus is viable, generally some point between week 24 and 26. This period uses a standard defined by the US Supreme Court in 1992, with the Planned Parenthood v. Casey ruling.

On May 20, 2019, the California State Senate passed Senate Bill 24, the College Student Right to Access Act. The Act requires public state universities to offer mifepristone, the abortion pill, to female students at zero cost by January 1, 2023; funding for the program will be paid for through insurance and private grants with $200,000 to each University of California and California State University health clinic for training and equipment. The bill was approved by both the California State Assembly and California State Senate as amended on September 13, 2019, was enacted by Governor Gavin Newsom on October 11, 2019, and went into effect on January 1, 2020. University clinics also have to set aside an additional $200,000 each to set up a student hotline to provide information to women seeking advice and assistance. The bill was sponsored by Sen. Connie Leyva.

In May 2022, State Senate President pro tempore Toni Atkins said she would introduce a state constitutional amendment to enshrine the right to an abortion after a draft opinion showed the US Supreme Court's intent to overturn Roe v. Wade. Both Newsom and Assembly Speaker Anthony Rendon expressed their support for the amendment. The Supreme Court did overturn Roe v. Wade in Dobbs v. Jackson Women's Health Organization,  later in 2022.

On November 8, 2022, California voters overwhelmingly passed Proposition 1, which amended the Constitution of California to explicitly protect the right to abortion; it is among the first three states do so, alongside Michigan and Vermont.

Amendment text

Judicial history 
In 1969, the California Supreme Court ruled in favor of abortion rights, after hearing an appeal launched by Dr. Leon Belous, who had been convicted of referring a woman to someone who could provide her with an illegal abortion; California's abortion law was declared unconstitutional in People v. Belous because it was vague and denied people due process. The US Supreme Court's decision in 1973's Roe v. Wade ruling meant the state could no longer regulate abortion in the first trimester. (However, the Supreme Court overturned Roe v. Wade in Dobbs v. Jackson Women's Health Organization,  later in 2022.)

In July 1984, the California Courts of Appeal overturned Superior Court of Los Angeles County judge Eli Chernow, ruling that fetuses could not be buried as human remains in the Los Angeles fetus disposal scandal, which was a win for pro-choice groups and feminists. The case had been appealed by Carol Downer of the Los Angeles Feminist Women's Health Center and the American Civil Liberties Union, and was denounced by the California Pro-Life Medical Association and the Catholic League. The appealing parties argued that allowing pro-life groups to bury the remains violated the separation of church and state. The Court's opinion stated: "It is clear from the record that the Catholic League is a religious organization which regards a fetus as a human being and abortion as murder. While this specific belief may well cross sectarian lines... any state action showing a preference for this belief will be strictly scrutinized and must be invalidated." Since fetal remains are normally incinerated without ceremony, there was no reason to do otherwise with these fetuses, stating "We perceive that the intended burial ceremony will enlist the prestige and power of the state. This is constitutionally forbidden." However, religious services could hold concurrent onsite memorial services, which was praised by US president Ronald Reagan in a letter to the California Pro-Life Medical Association, admiring their decision "to hold a memorial service for these children". Philibosian announced he would appeal the ruling allowing onsite memorial services. In October 1984, U.S. Supreme Court justice William Rehnquist refused to overturn the state appeals court ruling allowing the religious ceremonies. This was officially upheld by the Supreme Court in March 1985.

CPCs and the Pacific Justice Institute filed lawsuits challenging the constitutionality of the Reproductive FACT Act. The CPCs asserted that the law's requirements constituted compelled speech in violation of their rights to freedom of speech and free exercise of religion under the First Amendment. Among these was a lawsuit filed in the U.S. District Court for the Southern District of California by the National Institute of Family and Life Advocates (NIFLA) who represented over 100 CPCs in California. NIFLA sought a preliminary injunction to prevent the Reproductive FACT Act from coming into force on January 1, 2016, while the lawsuit continued. The Court denied the motion for a preliminary injunction in February 2016. NIFLA appealed from the denial of the preliminary injunction to the U.S. Court of Appeals for the Ninth Circuit in June 2016, which affirmed the judgment of the District Court in a unanimous decision authored by Judge Dorothy W. Nelson, joined by Judges A. Wallace Tashima and John B. Owens. After granting certioari as to the free speech question, in a controversial 5-4 opinion along ideological lines, the US Supreme Court reversed, holding that the FACT Act violated the Free Speech Clause of the First Amendment.

Clinic history 

Between 1982 and 1992, the number of abortion clinics in the state decreased by 29, going from 583 in 1982 to 554 in 1992. In the period between 1992 and 1996, the state ranked first in the loss of number of abortion clinics, losing 62 to have a total of 492 in 1996. In 2008, the states with the most providers were California with 522 and New York with 249. In 2014, there were 152 abortion clinics in the state. In 2014, 43% of the counties in the state did not have an abortion clinic. That year, 5% of women in the state aged 15–44 lived in a county without an abortion clinic. In March 2016, there were 114 Planned Parenthood clinics in the state. In 2017, there were 110 Planned Parenthood clinics, of which 93 offered abortion services, in a state with a population of 9,384,526 women aged 15–49.

Propositions
Between 1999 and 2015, there were 34 attempts to place on the ballot an initiative to impose a waiting period on abortions or require parental notification in California, of which only 3 succeeded in qualifying for a statewide vote. In 2022, the California State Legislature voted to place an initiative that codifies abortion and contraceptive rights throughout the state after the US Supreme Court overturned Roe v. Wade.

Statistics 
There were 5,030 therapeutic abortions in 1968 and 15,339 in 1969, and more than 60,000 in 1970. In 1990, 3,949,000 women in the state faced the risk of an unintended pregnancy. Alaska, California, and New Hampshire did not voluntarily provide the Center for Disease Control with abortion related data in 2000, nor did they provide any data the following year. In 2014, 57% of adults said in a poll by the Pew Research Center that abortion should be legal and 38% said it should be illegal in all or most cases. In 2017, the state had an infant mortality rate of 4.2 deaths per 1,000 live births.

Illegal abortion deaths and injuries 
In 1966 and 1967, there were 35 illegal abortion deaths. This decreased by 35% in the period between 1968 and 1969, when there were 22 deaths. In 1968, 701 women were admitted to one Los Angeles hospital alone for septic abortions, making the ratio of septic abortions to live births approximately 1 to 14. In the period between 1972 and 1974, there was only one illegal abortion death in California.

Abortion financing 
Seventeen states, including California, use their own funds to cover all or most "medically necessary" abortions sought by low-income women under Medicaid, thirteen of which are required by State court orders to do so. In 2010, the state had 88,466 publicly funded abortions, of which were zero federally and 88,466 were state funded.

In the Los Angeles fetus disposal scandal, Weisberg's Medical Analytical Laboratories received nearly $175,000 in Medi-Cal payments, with $88,000 coming from pathology tests on aborted fetuses. Of this, half of it ($44,000) was paid federally through the United States Department of Health and Human Services (HHS). By the Hyde Amendment, this money was ineligible for testing on pre-abortion or post-abortion tissue, which meant the state of California would need to pay back federal funds claimed by Weisberg and by any other laboratories, according to HHS inspector Richard P. Kusserow. Kusserow also stated "prior to its closing in April, 1981, [Medical Analytical Laboratories] had routinely submitted questionable billings under the Medi-Cal program, using an erroneous billing code.... the case lacked criminal prosecutive merit due to a lack of proof that the false billings were intentional. Because the laboratory was out of business, and its owner had declared bankruptcy, there were no assets against which to proceed for civil recovery".

Intersections with religion and religious figures 
In 1990, John Cardinal O'Connor of New York suggested that, by supporting abortion rights, Catholic politicians who were pro-choice risked excommunication. The response of Catholic pro-choice politicians to O'Connor's comment was generally defiant. Congresswoman Nancy Pelosi asserted that, "There is no desire to fight with the cardinals or archbishops. But it has to be clear that we are elected officials, and we uphold the law, and we support public positions separate and apart from our Catholic faith."

Politicians who have been targeted in such controversies include Lucy Killea, Mario Cuomo, John Kerry, Rudy Giuliani, and Joe Biden. California's Killea's case was the first recorded.

Abortion rights views and activities

Organizations 

The Society for Human Abortion was founded in 1963 in San Francisco. They sought to challenge laws around abortion by openly providing contraceptive and abortion services.

Protests 
#StopTheBans was created in response to 6 states passing legislation in early 2019 that would almost completely outlaw abortion. Women wanted to protest this activity as other state legislatures started to consider similar bans as part of a move to try to overturn Roe v. Wade. At least one protest as part of #StopTheBans took place in the state. Many women wore red, referencing women in Margaret Atwood's The Handmaid's Tale, at the protest in San Francisco outside City Hall. Women also protested in Los Angeles in an event organized by NARAL Pro-Choice California.

Political support 
California Senator Kamala Harris held a 2020 Democratic Party Primary campaign rally in Birmingham, Alabama, on June 7, 2019. One of the messages she talked about during her rally was abortion rights in the state. During the rally, she said that if she were president, she would require the Department of Justice to review any state law restriction abortion access "if it's coming from a state that has a history of limiting those rights". This way, the US Government could make sure that such laws were constitutional before going into effect, and prevent states like Alabama from continually trying to challenge established precedent that has legalized abortion through cases like Roe v. Wade.

Anti-abortion activities and views

Activities 
In May 1985, singer Pat Boone announced he recorded a song titled "Sixteen Thousand Faces" about the Los Angeles fetus disposal scandal, first played at a pro-life memorial service for the fetuses at Live Oak Memorial Park in Monrovia, where a granite tombstone was left with the inscription "For all those deprived of life and human love through abortion". In response, the California Abortion Rights Action League director said the service and marker "[humanized] fetuses when they deny the humanity of women already born". The ceremony was attended by "several hundred anti-abortionists", including Representative Bob Dornan and the Feminists for Life group. At the time, the fetuses had not been disposed of.

Protests 
The first Walk for Life was held on January 22, 2005. Several thousand protesters (7,000, according to organizers) gathered downtown in Justin Herman Plaza and marched 2.5 miles to the Marina Green via the waterfront.

Organizers claimed 15,000 demonstrators in 2006 and 20,000 in 2007. In 2008, the San Francisco Chronicle estimated at least 10,000 people were bussed in from all over the state and beyond. On Saturday, January 24, 2009, organizers claimed "tens of thousands" of marchers. On Saturday, January 22, 2011, more than 40,000 people gathered for the seventh annual Walk, in downtown San Francisco.

Violence 

On July 27, 1987, eight members of the Bible Missionary Fellowship, a fundamentalist church in Santee, California, attempted to bomb the Alvarado Medical Center abortion clinic. Church member Cheryl Sullenger procured gunpowder, bomb materials, and a disguise for co-conspirator Eric Everett Svelmoe, who planted a gasoline bomb. It was placed at the premises but failed to detonate as the fuse was blown out by wind. Rachelle "Shelley" Shannon attempted to set fires at abortion clinics in Oregon, California, Idaho, and Nevada during the late 1980s and early 1990s, and eventually plead guilty for these cases of arson. In 1993, she would be found guilty of attempted murder of Dr. George Tiller in 1993 at his Wichita, Kansas clinic. An incident of anti-abortion violence occurred at an abortion clinic in San Francisco on February 28, 1995. Another occurred at an abortion clinic in Modesto, California, on March 19, 2003.

Footnotes

References

External links 

 Image of a woman holding a large crucifix amid protesters with "Keep Abortion Legal" signs, Los Angeles, California, 1989. Los Angeles Times Photographic Archive (Collection 1429). UCLA Library Special Collections, Charles E. Young Research Library, University of California, Los Angeles.

California
Healthcare in California
Women in California